Hervé Bugnet (born 24 August 1981) is a retired French footballer who played as a striker.

External links
 
 Profile at L'Équipe

1981 births
Living people
Association football forwards
French footballers
France youth international footballers
Ligue 1 players
Ligue 2 players
FC Girondins de Bordeaux players
FC Martigues players
LB Châteauroux players
Le Havre AC players
Montpellier HSC players
Dijon FCO players
Lucena CF players
Chamois Niortais F.C. players
Thonon Evian Grand Genève F.C. players